Vasconcellea is a genus with 20 or 26 species of flowering plants in the family Caricaceae. Most were formerly treated in the genus Carica, but have been split out on genetic evidence. The genus name has also been spelled "Vasconcella".

They are evergreen pachycaul shrubs or small trees growing to 5 m tall, native to tropical South America. Many have edible fruit similar to papaya, and some are widely cultivated in South America.

Species
Vasconcellea badilloi
Vasconcellea candicans
Vasconcellea carvalhoae
Vasconcellea cauliflora
Vasconcellea chachapoyensis
Vasconcellea chilensis
Vasconcellea crassipetala
Vasconcellea glandulosa
Vasconcellea goudotiana
Vasconcellea horovitziana
Vasconcellea joseromeroi
Vasconcellea lanceolata
Vasconcellea longiflora
Vasconcellea microcarpa
Vasconcellea monoica
Vasconcellea omnilingua
Vasconcellea palandensis
Vasconcellea parviflora
Vasconcellea pentalobis
Vasconcellea peruviensis
Vasconcellea pubescens (Syn. Vasconcellea cundinamarcensis) (mountain papaya)
Vasconcellea pulchra
Vasconcellea quercifolia
Vasconcellea sphaerocarpa
Vasconcellea sprucei
Vasconcellea stipulata
Vasconcellea weberbaueri

Hybrids
Vasconcellea × heilbornii (babaco)

References

Ghent University: Vasconcellea
Badillo, V. M. (2000). Carica L. vs. Vasconcella St. Hil. (Caricaceae) con la rehabilitacion de este ultimo. Ernstia 10: 74–79.
Badillo, V. M. (2001). Nota correctiva Vasconcellea St. Hil. y no Vasconcella (Caricaceae). Ernstia 11: 75–76.
 Scheldeman, X. (2002). Distribution and potential of cherimoya (Annona cherimola Mill.) and highland papayas (Vasconcellea spp.) in Ecuador
Van Droogenbroeck, B. et al. (2002). AFLP analysis of genetic relationships among papaya and its wild relatives (Caricaceae) from Ecuador. Theoret. Appl. Genet. 105: 289–297.
 Tineo D, Bustamante DE, Calderon MS, Mendoza JE, Huaman E, Oliva M (2020) An integrative approach reveals five new species of highland papayas (Caricaceae, Vasconcellea) from northern Peru. PLoS ONE 15(12): e0242469. https://doi.org/10.1371/journal.pone.0242469 

 
Flora of South America
Tropical fruit
Brassicales genera